Edward Enoch "Jersey" Bakley (April 17, 1864 – February 17, 1915) was an American Major League Baseball pitcher in the late 19th century. He pitched for nine different teams in six years of play from 1883 to 1891. His last name was sometimes spelled "Bakely" or "Bakeley".

Career
Born in the Blackwood section of Gloucester Township, New Jersey, Bakley made his major league debut in 1883 at the age of 19 for the Philadelphia Athletics of the American Association. He went 5–3 for the eventual pennant winners.

Bakley spent the next several years in the minors before returning to the majors in 1888 and was arguably one of the better pitchers in the country in 1888 and 1889. His 532.2 innings pitched in 1888 ranked second in the AA, and he went 25–33 with a 2.97 earned run average. The next season, his 2.96 ERA was the second-best in the National League.

On September 3, 1890, Bakley gave up Harry Stovey's 100th homer, which was the first time that milestone had ever been reached.

Bakley finished his major league career with a 76–125 record, a 3.66 ERA, and 669 strikeouts in 1,782.2 innings pitched.

Bakley served as a first base umpire twice, both times while playing for Cleveland teams; first in August 1888 during a game in Kansas City, and again in July 1890 during a game in Boston where umpire Harry Leach had been knocked unconscious in the prior day's game.

References

External links
, or Retrosheet

 Jersey Bakley at SABR (Baseball BioProject)

1864 births
1915 deaths
19th-century baseball players
Major League Baseball pitchers
Philadelphia Athletics (AA) players
Philadelphia Keystones players
Wilmington Quicksteps players
Kansas City Cowboys (UA) players
Cleveland Blues (1887–88) players
Cleveland Spiders players
Cleveland Infants players
Washington Statesmen players
Baltimore Orioles (AA) players
Pottsville Antarcites players
Harrisburg (minor league baseball) players
Portland (minor league baseball) players
Albany Senators players
Oswego Sweegs players
Rochester Maroons players
Allentown Goobers players
Pottsville Colts players
Baseball players from New Jersey
People from Gloucester Township, New Jersey
Sportspeople from Camden County, New Jersey